Aish HaTorah (lit. "Fire of the Torah") is an Orthodox Jewish educational organization and yeshiva.

History

Aish HaTorah was established in Jerusalem in 1974 by Rabbi Noah Weinberg, after he left the Ohr Somayach yeshiva, which he had previously co-founded. The organization worked to educate young Jewish travelers and volunteers in favor of Orthodox Judaism. It later expanded worldwide, and continues promotes its extensive adult education classes. After Noah Weinberg died in February 2009, his son Rabbi Hillel Weinberg served as interim dean for a few years. In 2019, Rabbi Yitzchak Berkovits was named rosh yeshiva.

Philosophy
Aish HaTorah describes itself as blending the traditions of the Lithuanian yeshivas with the doctrines of Hasidism. Weinberg himself was a product of Lithuanian schools but he was also a grandson of the Slonimer Rebbe. His teachings reflect influences of both schools as well as certain facets of the Kabbalah of Moshe Chaim Luzzatto, the Vilna Gaon and others.

Aish HaTorah describes itself as pro-Israel and encourages Jewish people to visit Israel and connect to the land and its history. The organization's stated mission is "providing opportunities for Jews of all backgrounds to discover their heritage."

The organization is politically conservative and its officials have stated they oppose a full hand over of the West Bank to the Palestinians.

Programs
Aish HaTorah operates about 35 full-time branches on five continents, providing seminars, singles events, executive learning groups, Shabbat and Jewish holiday programs, and community building.

Jerusalem

In Jerusalem, the Aish HaTorah yeshiva offers both beginners' "drop-in classes" and full-time, intensive study programs for Jewish men and women of all backgrounds and levels of knowledge. The offering extends through a 2-year semikhah (rabbinic ordination) program; previously, participants were tested by the posek Zalman Nechemia Goldberg.

Discovery Seminar
The Jerusalem yeshiva includes a high-tech main campus and outreach center, that features a rooftop vista overlooking the Temple Mount. The campus houses the Kirk Douglas Theatre, which houses a dramatic film presentation of the Jewish contribution to humanity.

Aish HaTorah runs the Discovery Seminar. The four-hour seminar reviews Jewish history, Jewish philosophy, and Jewish philosophy questions.

Films
In 2005 Aish HaTorah produced a documentary film, Inspired which chronicles the lives of selected baalei teshuvah ("returnees to Jewish observance"). Aish HaTorah believes that the high rate of intermarriage between Jews and non-Jews has diluted the Jewish people's vitality. Inspired was produced to encourage more observant Jews to share their positive Jewish religious experiences of Jewish life with non-observant Jews, as a way to strengthen the baal teshuva movement and revitalize Jewish life.

In 2007 Aish released a sequel, Inspired Too. These films paved the way for Project Inspire, the grassroots organization that helps inspire Orthodox Jews to reach out to non-affiliated Jews to teach them about their heritage. Once an offshoot of Aish HaTorah, Project Inspire is now an independent organization under the umbrella of Aish Global.

In 2008, the Clarion Project, an organization that formerly shared staff, fundraising sources and an address with Aish HaTorah, and has been linked in media reports with Aish HaTorah, distributed its film, Obsession: Radical Islam's War Against the West. The film had been criticized for being unfair in its portrayal of Muslims as violent. The film was sent to more than 28 million people in the United States in anticipation of the United States presidential election. Aish HaTorah denied any connection to the film. The Council on American–Islamic Relations filed a complaint about the film with the Federal Election Commission.

Hasbara Fellowships

When the Israeli Foreign Ministry sought to combat anti-Israel ideas on college campuses, it worked with Aish HaTorah to develop the Hasbara Fellowships. This program has flown hundreds of student leaders to Israel for intensive training in pro-Israel activism training. In North America, Hasbara Fellowships guides and funds pro-Israel activities on over 100 college campuses.

The Israel-Diaspora Initiative
In August 2016, the Israeli government announced an Israel-Diaspora outreach program called The Israel-Diaspora Initiative. The program partners were announced as Chabad and Olami Worldwide, an organization that works closely with Aish.

Aish Gesher
Aish Gesher is an English speaking Yeshiva for young men with a solid basis in Gemara and Halacha. It is also integrated with  Aish Discovery and Essentials classes.

Embezzlement case 
In December 2013, Aish HaTorah of New York filed suit against its former chief financial officer Jacob Fetman to enforce a Beth Din of America ruling that Fetman had stolen $20 million in funds from the organization.

Notable faculty
 Noah Weinberg (1930 – 2009), founder
 Chaim Malinowitz (1952 – 2019)

References

External links

 
Baalei teshuva institutions
Educational institutions established in 1974
Orthodox Jewish outreach
Orthodox yeshivas in Jerusalem
Giving
Jewish organizations based in Israel
Religious organizations based in Israel
Lithuanian-Jewish culture in Israel
Israel articles missing geocoordinate data